Giuseppe Bonati (1635 – March 12, 1681) was an Italian painter of the Baroque period, active in Rome and Ferrara.

He is also known as Giovannino del Pio or Giovanni Bonatti. He initially trained as a pupil of Francesco Costanzo Cattaneo and Leonello Bononi. Under the patronage of cardinal Carlo Pio di Savoia, in 1658 he was sent to Bologna to train with Guercino. In 1662, he travels to Rome to work in the studio of Pier Francesco Mola. Bonati attempts to establish a studio to rival Carlo Maratta. Along with his patrons, he traveled through Italy, including Venice, returning in 1665 to Rome where he worked in many churches, including Santa Croce in Gerusalemme and Santa Maria in Vallicella. In the Museo Capitolino are paintings of Rinaldo and Armida as well as Sisera and Jael. He painted for Queen Christina of Sweden.

References

Dates.

External links
 Census of Ferrarese Paintings and Drawings

Giovanni Bonatti on artnet

1635 births
1681 deaths
People from the Province of Ferrara
17th-century Italian painters
Italian male painters
Painters from Ferrara
Italian Baroque painters